Sebastiaan Nooij (born November 26, 1987) is a Dutch professional baseball catcher who is a free agent.

He began playing in the Dutch league in 2006 but moved to the U.S. to attend college in 2007. He attended Lower Columbia College and Hawaii Pacific University and returned to the Netherlands to play baseball in 2009.

He joined the Netherlands national baseball team and was added to the roster for the 2013 World Baseball Classic after the starting catcher was injured.

References

External links

1987 births
2013 World Baseball Classic players
Baseball catchers
Dutch expatriate baseball players in the United States
Hawaii Pacific Sharks baseball players
Living people
Sportspeople from Amstelveen
L&D Amsterdam Pirates players
Auckland Tuatara players
Expatriate baseball players in New Zealand
Canberra Cavalry players
Dutch expatriate sportspeople in New Zealand
Adelaide Bite players
Dutch expatriate baseball players in Australia